This page shows the progress of Bury F.C. in the 2010–11 football season. This year they play their games in League Two in the English league system.

Players

First-team squad
Includes all players who were awarded squad numbers during the season.

Results

Pre-season

League Two

FA Cup

League Cup

Football League Trophy

League data

League table

Results summary

Results by round

Appearances and goals
As of 6 May 2011.
(Substitute appearances in brackets)

Awards

Transfers

References

Bury F.C. seasons
Bury